Derevaun Seraun is a studio album by English musician Kiran Leonard. It was released in September 2017 under Moshi Moshi Records.

The album was released to celebrate the re-opening of Manchester Central Library, and was inspired by poets such as James Joyce, Albert Camus, Clarice Lispector, Henry Miller and Manuel Bandeira

Track listing

Accolades

References

2017 albums
Moshi Moshi Records albums